Stoughton High School (SHS) is a public high school the town of Stoughton, Massachusetts, United States. It serves students in  grades 9 to 12 and is a part of Stoughton Public Schools. It has an average of 300 students per grade level. It is located on 232 Pearl Street in Stoughton, Massachusetts. The principal is Juliette Miller. SHS is known for their award-winning marching band and color guard, known as the Marching Black Knights.

History
Originally built in 1923, Stoughton High School had multiple additions before being completely rebuilt. (https://compass.vertexeng.com/projects/stoughton-high-school/)

The Stoughton High School Building Committee voted on Thursday, November 12, 2015 to recommend to the Massachusetts School Building Authority (MSBA) that the Town construct option C2A, to build a new Stoughton High School. The preliminary cost analysis for the total project is estimated to be $126,137,847. The projected state reimbursement is estimated at $54,598,291. The Town’s protected share of the cost is estimated to be $71,539,557.

Sports
The Stoughton High School mascot is the Black Knights and the colors are orange and black.

Fall sports at Stoughton High School include football, marching band, volleyball, cross country, soccer, golf, field hockey, and cheerleading. Winter sports include boys basketball, girls basketball, swimming, indoor track and field, ice hockey, wrestling, and cheerleading. Spring sports include lacrosse, softball, baseball, track and field, and tennis.

Notable alumni

Darin Jordan, former NFL player
Ryan LaCasse, former NFL player
Robert Lanza, scientist
Ed McGuinness, comic book artist
Lori McKenna American folk singer/songwriter
Gerard O'Neill, Pulitzer Prize winning journalist and editor of The Boston Globe
Kenny Wormald, professional dancer and star of the 2011 film Footloose, graduated in 2002
Paula J. Olsiewski, American biochemist

References

External links
Stoughton High School website
Stoughton High School Bands website
Stoughton High School Overview at USNews

Schools in Norfolk County, Massachusetts
Public high schools in Massachusetts
Hockomock League